H-Kayne is a Moroccan rap group that was created in the city of Meknes in 1996.

History 
H-Kayne was formed in Meknes in 1996. The group performed their first concert in 1997. In 2003, they won first prize at the L’Boulevard festival. In 2004, the group released a self-produced album, 1 Son 2 Bled'Art.

In 2005, H-Kayne released a second album called "HK-1426" produced by Platinum Music.

In 2006, H-Kayne performed at the Bataclan in Paris, the only Moroccan rappers to have done so.

In 2011, H-Kayne were appointed goodwill ambassadors in Morocco for the United Nations Development Program.

In 2013, the group were bestowed the Order of Ouissam Alaouite by King Mohammed VI.

Discography

Albums 
 1 Son 2 Bled'Art (2004)

 HK 14216 (2005)
 H-Kaynology (2009)

References

External links 
 H-Kayne songs 

Musical groups established in 1996
Moroccan rappers
Moroccan hip hop
Moroccan musical groups